Helen Mason may refer to:

 Helen Mason (endocrinologist), British endocrinologist
 Helen Mason (journalist) (1938–1989), British journalist and children's author
 Helen Mason (physicist), British theoretical physicist
 Helen Mason (potter) (1915–2014), New Zealand potter